Gatlinburg is a mountain resort city in Sevier County, Tennessee, United States. It is a popular vacation resort, as it rests on the border of Great Smoky Mountains National Park along U.S. Route 441, which connects to Cherokee, North Carolina, on the southeast side of the national park. Prior to incorporation, the town was known as White Oak Flats, or just simply White Oak.

History

Early history 

For centuries, Cherokee hunters, as well as other Native American hunters before them, used a footpath known as the Indian Gap Trail to access the abundant game in the forests and coves of the Smokies. This trail connected the Great Indian Warpath with Rutherford Indian Trace, following the West Fork of the Little Pigeon River from modern-day Sevierville through modern-day Pigeon Forge, Gatlinburg, and the Sugarlands, crossing the crest of the Smokies along the slopes of Mount Collins, and descending into North Carolina along the banks of the Oconaluftee River. US-441 largely follows this same route today, although it crests at Newfound Gap rather than Indian Gap.

Although various 18th-century European and early American hunters and fur trappers probably traversed or camped in the flats where Gatlinburg is now situated, it was Edgefield, South Carolina, native William Ogle (1751–1803) who first decided to permanently settle in the area. With the help of the Cherokee, Ogle cut, hewed, and notched logs in the flats, planning to erect a cabin the following year. He returned home to Edgefield to retrieve his family and grow one final crop for supplies. However, shortly after his arrival in Edgefield, a malaria epidemic swept the low country, and Ogle succumbed to the disease in 1803.

His widow, Martha Huskey Ogle (1756–1827), moved the family to Virginia, where she had relatives. Sometime around 1806, Martha Huskey Ogle made the journey over Indian Gap Trail to what is now Gatlinburg with her brother, Peter Huskey, her daughter, Rebecca, and her daughter's husband, James McCarter. William Ogle's notched logs awaited them, and they erected a cabin near the confluence of Baskins Creek and the West Fork of the Little Pigeon shortly after their arrival. The cabin still stands today near the heart of Gatlinburg. James and Rebecca McCarter settled in the Cartertown district of Gatlinburg.

In the decade following the arrival of the Ogles, McCarters, and Huskeys in what came to be known as White Oak Flats, a steady stream of settlers moved into the area. Most were veterans of the American Revolution or War of 1812 who had converted the  tracts they had received for service in war into deeds. Among these early settlers were Timothy Reagan (c. 1750–1830), John Ownby Jr. (1791–1857), and Henry Bohanon (1760–1842). Their descendants still live in the area today.

Radford Gatlin and the Civil War 

In 1856, a post office was established in the general store of Radford Gatlin (c. 1798–1880), giving the town the name "Gatlinburg." even though the town bore his name, Gatlin, who didn't arrive in the flats until around 1854, constantly bickered with his neighbors. By 1857, a full-blown feud had erupted between the Gatlins and the Ogles, probably over Gatlin's attempts to divert the town's main road. The eve of the U.S. Civil War found Gatlin, who became a Confederate sympathizer, at odds with the residents of the flats, who were mostly pro-Union, and he was forced out in 1859.

Despite its anti-slavery sentiments, Gatlinburg, like most Smoky communities, tried to remain neutral during the war. This changed when a company of Confederate Colonel William Holland Thomas' Legion occupied the town to protect the salt peter mines at Alum Cave, near the Tennessee-North Carolina border. Federal forces marched south from Knoxville and Sevierville to drive out Thomas' men, who had built a small fort on Burg Hill. Lucinda Oakley Ogle, whose grandfather witnessed the ensuing skirmish, later recounted her grandfather's recollections:... he told me about when he was a sixteen-year-old boy during the Civil War and would hide under a big cliff on Turkey Nest Ridge and watch the Blue Coats ride their horses around the graveyard hill, shooting their cannon toward Burg Hill where the Grey Coats had a fort and would ride their horses around the Burg Hill ...

As the Union forces converged on the town, the outnumbered Confederates were forced to retreat across the Smokies to North Carolina. Confederate forces did not return, although sporadic small raids continued until the end of the war.

Early 20th century 
In the 1880s, the invention of the band saw and the logging railroad led to a boom in the lumber industry. As forests throughout the Southeastern United States were harvested, lumber companies pushed deeper into the mountain areas of the Appalachian highlands. In 1901, Colonel W.B. Townsend established the Little River Lumber Company in Tuckaleechee Cove to the west, and lumber interests began buying up logging rights to vast tracts of forest in the Smokies.

Andrew Jackson Huff (1878–1949), originally of Greene County, was a pivotal figure in Gatlinburg at this time. Huff erected a sawmill in Gatlinburg in 1900, and local residents began supplementing their income by providing lodging to loggers and other lumber company officials. Tourists also began to trickle into the area, drawn to the Smokies by the writings of authors such as Mary Noailles Murfree and Horace Kephart, who wrote extensively about the region's natural wonders.

In 1912, the Pi Beta Phi women's fraternity established a settlement school (now Arrowmont School of Arts and Crafts) in Gatlinburg after a survey of the region found the town to be most in need of educational facilities in the area. Although skeptical locals were initially worried that the fraternity might be religious propagandists or opportunists, the school's enrollment grew from 33 to 134 in its first year of operation. Along with providing basic education to children in the area, the school's staff created a small market for local crafts.

The journals and letters of the Pi Beta Phi settlement school's staff are a valuable source of information about daily life in Gatlinburg in the early 1900s. Phyllis Higinbotham, a nurse from Toronto who worked at the school for six years, wrote of the mountain peoples' confusion over the role of a nurse, their penchant for calling on her for minute issues, and her difficulties with Appalachian customs:
I soon found that people weren't used to hurrying, and that it takes a long time of patient waiting and general conversation to find out what they have really come for, or to get a history of the cases when making a visit. I have had to get used to getting most of a woman's symptoms from her husband, and not having heart failure when a messenger comes with the news that so and so is "bad off", "about to die", or "got the fever."

Higinbotham complained that there was an unhealthy "lack of variety" in the mountain peoples' diet and that they weren't open to new suggestions. Food was often "too starchy", "not well cooked", and supplemented with certain excesses:One of the doctors was called to several cases of honey poisoning. The men had robbed some bee gums, eaten a pound or two of each and been knocked unconscious where they stood.

Evelyn Bishop, a Pi Beta Phi who arrived at the school in 1913, reported that the mountain peoples' relative isolation from American society allowed them to retain folklore that reflected their English and Scots-Irish ancestries, such as Elizabethan Era ballads: Many times it is the ballad that the child learns first, no Mother Goose melodies are as familiar, and it is strange indeed to listen to a little tot singing of the courtly days of old, the knights and 'ladyes' and probably the tragic death of the lover.

Such isolation attracted folklorists such as Cecil Sharp of London to the area in the years following World War I. Sharp's collection of Appalachian ballads was published in 1932.

National park 

Extensive logging in the early 1900s led to increased calls by conservationists for federal action, and in 1911, Congress passed the Weeks Act to allow for the purchase of land for national forests. Authors such as Horace Kephart and Knoxville-area businesses began advocating for the creation of a national park in the Smokies that would be similar to Yellowstone or Yosemite in the Western United States.

Andrew Huff spearheaded the movement in the Gatlinburg area, and he opened the first hotel in Gatlinburg – the Mountain View Hotel – in 1916. His son, Jack, established LeConte Lodge atop Mount Le Conte in 1926. In spite of resistance from lumberers at Elkmont and difficulties with the Tennessee legislature, Great Smoky Mountains National Park opened in 1934.

The park radically changed Gatlinburg. When the Pi Beta Phis arrived in 1912, Gatlinburg was a small hamlet with six houses, a blacksmith shop, a general store, a Baptist church, and a greater community of 600 individuals, most of whom lived in log cabins. In 1934, the first year the park was open, an estimated 40,000 visitors passed through the city. Within a year, this number had increased over twelvefold to 500,000. From 1940 to 1950, the cost per acre of land in Gatlinburg increased from $50 to $8,000.

While the park's arrival benefited Gatlinburg and made many of the town's residents wealthy, the tourism explosion led to problems with air quality and urban sprawl. Even in modern times, the town's infrastructure is often pushed to the limit on peak vacation days and must consistently adapt to accommodate the growing number of tourists.

Fire of 1992
On the night of July 14, 1992, Gatlinburg gained national attention when an entire city block burned to the ground due to faulty wiring in a light fixture. The Ripley's Believe It or Not! museum was consumed by the fire, along with an arcade, haunted house, and souvenir shop. The blaze was stopped before it could consume the adjacent 32-story Gatlinburg Space Needle. Known to locals as "Rebel Corner," the block was completely rebuilt and reopened to visitors in 1995. Few artifacts from the Ripley's Museum were salvaged, and those that survived are marked with that designation in the new museum. The fire prompted new downtown building codes and a new downtown fire station. Ripley's has caught fire twice since it reopened, once in 2000 and again in 2003. Both of those fires, coincidentally, were caused by faulty light fixtures. The 2000 fire caused no damage, and the 2003 fire was contained to the building's exterior, with the museum suffering minimal damage, primarily cosmetic.

Fire of 2016

Starting in the Great Smoky Mountains National Park at Chimney Tops, a moderately contained wildfire was compounded by very strong winds – with gusts recorded up to  – and extremely dry conditions due to drought, causing it to spread down into Gatlinburg, Pigeon Forge, Pittman Center, and other nearby areas. It forced mass evacuations, and Governor Bill Haslam ordered the National Guard to the area. The center of Gatlinburg's tourist district escaped heavy damage, but the surrounding wooded region was called "the apocalypse" by a fire department lieutenant. Approximately 14,000 people were evacuated that evening, more than 2,400 structures were damaged or destroyed, and damages totaled more than $500 million. Fourteen people died in the fires – some local citizens and some visiting tourists.

Following the fires, the town of Gatlinburg was shut down and considered a crime scene. The city reopened to residents only after a few days but maintained a strict curfew for more than a week, only reopening to the public after the curfew was lifted. In June 2017, the Sevier County district attorney dropped the charges against the two juveniles due to an inability to prove their actions led to the devastation that occurred in Gatlinburg five days later. According to D.A. James Dunn in an official statement, other factors played a key role, particularly the wind:But for the winds that reached speeds above , it is improbable that the Chimney Tops II fire would have left the Great Smoky Mountains National Park and reached Gatlinburg. In May 2018, two Gatlinburg residents filed a $14.8 million lawsuit against the federal government for personal losses suffered in the fire.

Registered historic sites 
 First Methodist Church, Gatlinburg: Designed by Charles I. Barber in Late Gothic Revival style.
 Settlement School Community Outreach Historic District: Phi Beta Pi established a settlement school in the area in 1912. This part of the designated historic district includes the Jennie Nicol Health Clinic Building, the Arrowcraft Shop, the Ogle Cabin, Cottage at the Creek, and Craftsman's Fair Grounds and School Playground.  The Settlement School Dormitories and Dwellings Historic District consists of Helmick House (Teacher's Cottage), Stuart Dormitory, Ruth Barrett Smith Staff House, Old Wood Studio, a chicken coop, and a stock barn.

Geography
It is surrounded on all sides by high ridges, with the Le Conte and Sugarland Mountain massifs rising to the south, Cove Mountain to the west, Big Ridge to the northeast, and Grapeyard Ridge to the east. The main watershed is the West Fork of the Little Pigeon River, which flows from its source on the slopes of Mount Collins to its junction with the Little Pigeon at Sevierville.

U.S. Route 441 is the main traffic artery in Gatlinburg, running through the center of town from north to south. U.S. Route 321 enters Gatlinburg from Pigeon Forge and Wears Valley to the north before turning east and connecting the city to Newport and Cosby.

Climate
Gatlinburg has a humid subtropical climate (Koppen: Cfa) with hot, humid summers and cool, wet winters. Precipitation is heavy year round, peaking in the months of May–July, with October being the driest month, with only  of average precipitation.

Demographics

2020 census

As of the 2020 United States census, there were 3,577 people, 1,742 households, and 1,012 families residing in the city.

2010 census
As of the 2010 census, Gatlinburg had 3,944 people, 1,681 households, and 1,019 families residing in the city with 5,825 housing units available. The racial makeup of the city was 85.3% White, 0.6% African American, 0.4% American Indian/Alaska Native, 2.8% Asian, 0.0% Pacific Islander, 8.9% from other races, and 1.9% from two or more races. Hispanic or Latino of any race accounted for 15% of the population.

Of the 1,681 households, 22.8% had children under the age of 18 living in them, 44.1% were married couples living together, 10.1% had a female householder with no husband present, 6.5% had a male householder with no wife present, and 39.4% were non-families. Individuals living alone accounted for 29.4% of the non-family households, and 11.3% of those living alone were 65 years of age or older. The average household size was 2.33, and the average family size was 2.8.

The city's population consisted of 18.5% of individuals under the age of 20, 5.9% from 20 to 24, 25.9% from 25 to 44, 31.2% from 45 to 64, and 18.5% 65 years of age or older. The median age was 44.7 years. The ratio of males to females was almost equivalent at 1.02:1 (1,990 males to 1,954 females). For adult individuals 18 or older, the ratio of males to females was also very close at 1.03:1 (1,671 males to 1,628 females).

According to data in the 2012–2016 American Community Survey 5-Year Estimates conducted by the U.S. Census Bureau for Gatlinburg, the median income for a household in Gatlinburg was estimated at $36,445, with an estimated median family income of $42,903. For individuals who were employed full-time, males had a median income of $30,159 versus $24,528 for females. The per capita income for the city was $24,423, and 15% of the population and 5.8% of families had income levels below the poverty line. 13.8% of those under the age of 18 and 8.3% of those 65 years and older were living below the poverty line.

As of July 1, 2017, the 2017 estimated population of Gatlinburg had increased to 4,163.

Economy

Tourism

Bordering Great Smoky Mountains National Park, Gatlinburg is an important tourist destination in Tennessee, with many man-made attractions. Ober Gatlinburg is the only ski resort in the state. It has eight ski trails, three chair lifts, and a wildlife encounter area and is accessible via roads and a gondola from the city strip. The Gatlinburg Trolley, a privately funded public transit system, caters to area tourists.

The Gatlinburg SkyLift takes visitors up  to the top of Crockett Mountain, to the longest footbridge in the US which spans two mountains.

Gatlinburg Space Needle provides a 360-degree view of the Smoky Mountains from its  observation tower. The attraction includes glass elevators, educational exhibits on the history of Gatlinburg, a two-story arcade, and since 2016 a magic and mentalism performance at the Iris Theater.

The Gatlinburg Arts and Crafts Community is an 8-mile loop located on the north side of town, It is dedicated to preserving traditional mountain crafts. With over 100 artists and craftsmen, the Community is a living, breathing tribute to the history of Tennessee. The carvers, weavers, watercolor artists, casters, soap makers, potters, silversmiths and dozens of other artisans skillfully demonstrate their abilities, as well as several restaurants.

The Ripley's group of attractions includes Ripley's Aquarium of the Smokies, which opened in 1997 and features special exhibits covering subjects such as the Titanic, pirates, and the planet Mars, Ripley's Haunted Adventure, Odditorium, Mirror Maze, 5D Moving Theater, Guinness World Records, Old MacDonald's Farm Mini Golf, and Davy Crockett Mini Golf. Ripley's Super Fun Zone was added in 2020.

Anakeesta is a nearby theme park named after the Anakeesta Formation that makes up many of the mountains near Gatlinburg, including Chimney Tops, Charlie's Bunion, and Mount Kephart. In Cherokee, the name means "the place of the balsams" and refers to high ground. The park has zip lines, chair and gondola rides to the top of Anakeesta Mountain, and a mountain coaster. Inside the park, Firefly Village has shops and restaurants. Dollywood and Dollywood's Splash Country, which are both named for Dolly Parton, are amusement parks located in nearby Pigeon Forge.

Hollywood Star Cars Museum, which opened in 1996, features Mayberry's squad car, The Beverly Hillbillies jalopy, DRAG-U-LA from The Munsters, two Batmobiles, the Camaro from Charlie's Angels, and Herbie the Love Bug. Many of the featured vehicles were designed by George Barris. The Museum of Salt and Pepper Shakers houses more than 20,000 shakers from all over the world.

A few music- and family-oriented theaters are located in Gatlinburg, including Sweet Fanny Adams Theatre for musical comedy. Christ in the Smokies uses 3D dioramas with life-size figures, music, lighting, and special effects to tell the story of Christ.

Gatlinburg has numbered intersections in the core of the town. The numbers hang from traffic lights or signs and are written on official tourist maps. (A similar idea was tried in Niagara Falls, New York, after the mayor of Niagara Falls visited Gatlinburg and took the idea back to Niagara Falls. The idea was short-lived in New York and was scrapped due to budget issues.)

During the Christmas season, the entire downtown area is decorated with lights for the Winterfest Celebration that takes place from November through February. A Trolley Ride of Lights is available from early November to late January during the celebration, and a free shuttle bus traverses the city every half-hour.

Because of the ease of obtaining a marriage license in Tennessee, Gatlinburg is a popular destination for weddings and honeymoons, with more than 20 wedding chapels in the town and surrounding areas.

Gatlinburg is mentioned in the lyrics to the Johnny Cash song A Boy Named Sue, written by Shel Silverstein.

Former attractions

Cooter's Place was a free Dukes of Hazzard museum with the General Lee, indoor go-karts, and indoor mini golf. The museum portion moved to Pigeon Forge, the building and mini-golf were re-opened as Ripley's Super Fun Zone.

World of Illusions, which opened in Gatlinburg in 1977, closed on January 6, 2020. The building has yet to be re-developed.

Convention Center

The Convention Center hosts the annual week-long Gatlinburg Regional, the largest non-National bridge tournament in the U.S., which attracts over 3,000 players from all over the world.

Law enforcement agencies 
The Gatlinburg Police Department, sometimes referred to as "GPD", is the primary law enforcement organization serving Gatlinburg, Tennessee in the United States. The department has a staff of 45 officers and 10 support personnel. The department maintains a large force size for a small town primarily due to the large volume of tourists that pass through the area annually.

Notable people
 Felice and Boudleaux Bryant: Songwriting duo, who lived in Gatlinburg from 1978 onward, where they wrote numerous songs such as Rocky Top. They lived in the Gatlinburg Inn, and afterwards in The Bryant House which still hosts a museum with their belongings.
 Travis Meadows (born 1965): A country music singer and songwriter who has written songs for stars like Eric Church, Wynonna Judd and Dierks Bentley, Meadows started his songwriting career while living in Gatlinburg.
 John Reagan (1818–1905): Born in Gatlinburg, Reagan moved to Texas as an adult and became a career politician who served in the Texas House of Representatives, the U.S. House of Representatives, the U.S. Senate, and as Postmaster General and Secretary of the Treasury for the Confederate States of America.

References

External links

 
 
 Gatlinburg Department of Tourism

 
Cities in Tennessee
Cities in Sevier County, Tennessee
Communities of the Great Smoky Mountains
1800s establishments in Tennessee